Streletskoye is a rural locality (a selo) and the administrative center of Streletskoye Rural Settlement, Yakovlevsky District, Belgorod Oblast, Russia. The population was 798 as of 2010. There are 28 streets.

Geography 
Streletskoye is located 23 km southwest of Stroitel (the district's administrative centre) by road. Pushkarnoye is the nearest rural locality.

References 

Rural localities in Yakovlevsky District, Belgorod Oblast